Kurt Meißner (11 December 1897 – 1973) was a German international footballer.

References

1897 births
1973 deaths
Association football forwards
German footballers
Germany international footballers

de:Kurt Meissner